Events in 1991 in Japanese television.

Debuts

Ongoing shows
Music Fair, music (1964–present)
Mito Kōmon, jidaigeki (1969-2011)
Sazae-san, anime (1969–present)
Ōoka Echizen, jidaigeki (1970-1999)
FNS Music Festival, music (1974-present)
Panel Quiz Attack 25, game show (1975–present)
Doraemon, anime (1979-2005)
Kiteretsu Daihyakka, anime (1988-1996)
Soreike! Anpanman, anime (1988-present)
YAWARA! a fashionable judo girl, anime (1989-1992)
Ranma ½ Nettohen, anime (1989−1992)
Dragon Ball Z, anime (1989-1996)
Downtown no Gaki no Tsukai ya Arahende!!, game show (1989-present)
Chibi Maruko-chan, anime (1990-1992)
Magical Taruruto-kun, anime (1990-1992)

Resuming

Endings

See also
1991 in anime
List of Japanese television dramas
1991 in Japan
List of Japanese films of 1991

References